The 2020 Hamburg state election was held on 23 February 2020 to elect the members of the 22nd Hamburg Parliament. The outgoing government was a coalition of the Social Democratic Party (SPD) and The Greens led by First Mayor Peter Tschentscher.

Despite losses, the SPD remained comfortably in first place with 39% of votes. The Greens doubled their vote share to 24%, becoming the second largest party in the state Parliament for the first time. The opposition Christian Democratic Union (CDU) suffered their worst ever result in Hamburg, and their worst result in any state election since 1952, falling to third place with 11% of votes. The Left achieved a small upswing and remained in fourth place. The Alternative for Germany (AfD) narrowly cleared the 5% electoral threshold, recording a decline compared to its previous result for the first time in any state or national-level election. The Free Democratic Party lost a third of its vote share and fell narrowly short of the 5% electoral threshold, in total winning only one seat from a direct constituency.

The SPD–Green government was returned with an increased majority of 87 seats, comprising 71% of the Parliament. The coalition was subsequently renewed. Peter Tschentscher was re-elected Mayor on 10 June.

Issues and campaign

Federal
The Hamburg state election was overshadowed by the Thuringia government crisis, the resignation of Annegret Kramp-Karrenbauer as federal CDU leader, and a terrorist attack targeting immigrants in Hanau which took place four days before the election.

Local

In the wake of the Thuringia government crisis, approximately 20% of the FDP's election posters in Hamburg were defaced or destroyed. Greens leader Katharina Fegebank stated that such actions "harmed democracy".

Electoral system
The elections were conducted under a list proportional system in the same manner as the prior election. 71 seats were awarded directly in the 17 multi-mandate constituencies (of between 3-5 seats each) via open constituency lists, and the remaining 50 via at-large open state lists based on percentage of the overall vote with a 5% electoral threshold.

Each voter had a total of ten votes: five constituency votes for the direct candidates in the constituency, and five at-large votes for candidates on the state lists (or for state lists in their entirety). The five votes could be amassed all on one person, party, or list (accumulation) or could be distributed/split between different candidates, parties, or lists as desired (panachage). Voting privileges were passively awarded, meaning anyone over the age of 18 meeting eligibility requirements was automatically enrolled.

Parties
The table below lists parties represented in the 21st Hamburg Parliament.

Opinion polling

Election result

At one polling booth in Langenhorn, the results for the FDP and Greens were accidentally reversed, meaning the preliminary results placed the FDP only 121 votes above the threshold. The mistake was corrected in the official count which took place over 24 hours later. Exit polls suggested that AfD would miss the threshold while FDP would exceed it, leading to early press reports of an AfD defeat and exclusion of its politicians from post-election debates.

|-
| align=center colspan=8| 
|-
! colspan="2" | Party
! Votes
! %
! +/-pp
! Seats 
! +/-
! Seats %
|-
| bgcolor=| 
| align=left | Social Democratic Party (SPD)
| align=right| 1,591,098
| align=right| 39.2
| align=right| 6.4
| align=right| 54
| align=right| 4
| align=right| 43.9
|-
| bgcolor=| 
| align=left | Alliance 90/The Greens (Grüne)
| align=right| 980,361
| align=right| 24.2
| align=right| 11.9
| align=right| 33
| align=right| 18
| align=right| 26.8
|-
| bgcolor=| 
| align=left | Christian Democratic Union (CDU)
| align=right| 452,372
| align=right| 11.2
| align=right| 3.7
| align=right| 15
| align=right| 5
| align=right| 12.2
|-
| bgcolor=| 
| align=left | The Left (Linke)
| align=right| 368,471
| align=right| 9.1
| align=right| 0.6
| align=right| 13
| align=right| 2
| align=right| 10.6
|-
| bgcolor=| 
| align=left | Alternative for Germany (AfD)
| align=right| 214,596
| align=right| 5.3
| align=right| 0.8
| align=right| 7
| align=right| 1
| align=right| 5.7
|-
| bgcolor=| 
| align=left | Free Democratic Party (FDP)
| align=right| 201,162
| align=right| 4.9
| align=right| 2.5
| align=right| 1
| align=right| 8
| align=right| 0.8
|-
! colspan=8|
|-
| bgcolor=| 
| align=left | Die PARTEI (PARTEI)
| align=right| 56,775
| align=right| 1.4
| align=right| 0.5
| align=right| 0
| align=right| ±0
| align=right| 0
|-
| bgcolor=| 
| align=left | Volt Germany (VOLT)
| align=right| 52,241
| align=right| 1.3
| align=right| 1.3
| align=right| 0
| align=right| ±0
| align=right| 0
|-
| bgcolor=|
| align=left | Others
| align=right| 137,785
| align=right| 3.4
| align=right| 
| align=right| 0
| align=right| ±0
| align=right| 0
|-
! align=right colspan=2| Total
! align=right| 4,054,861
! align=right| 100.0
! align=right| 
! align=right| 123
! align=right| 2
! align=right| 
|-
! align=right colspan=2| Voter turnout
! align=right| 
! align=right| 63.2
! align=right| 6.7
! align=right| 
! align=right| 
! align=right| 
|}

Government formation
Mayor Tschentscher stated that exploratory talks with the Greens were "the first priority", but that "we will also - if the majorities are confirmed - approach the CDU and hold a conversation." Marcus Weinberg of the CDU stated he was "ready for talks" with the SPD. Lead candidate for the Greens Katharina Fegebank called for "More red-green, with strong greens in the government." Cansu Özdemir of The Left stated her party wished to remain a strong opposition force.

The SPD and Greens came to a coalition agreement at the end of May. The SPD took 7 ministries and the Greens 4, a net gain of one for the Greens. The vote for Mayor took place on 10 June, and Tschentscher was re-elected Mayor with 87 votes in favour, 34 against, and 2 abstentions. The new cabinet was also approved with 83 votes in favour, 38 against, and 2 abstentions.

See also
 Elections in Hamburg
 Hamburg state elections in the Weimar Republic

References

External links

2020 elections in Germany
2020 state election
2020
February 2020 events in Germany